Lasha Gujejiani (Georgian:ლაშა გუჯეჯიანი)(born August 12, 1985) is a Georgian judoka.

Achievements

External links
 
 

1985 births
Living people
Male judoka from Georgia (country)
Judoka at the 2004 Summer Olympics
Judoka at the 2008 Summer Olympics
Olympic judoka of Georgia (country)
21st-century people from Georgia (country)